The Journal of Neurology is a peer-reviewed medical journal covering research on diseases of the nervous system. It was established in 1891 as the Deutsche Zeitschrift für Nervenheilkunde and was renamed to Zeitschrift für Neurologie in 1947. It obtained its current title in 1971. Publication was interrupted in 1945 and 1946.

References

External links 
 

Neurology journals
Monthly journals
Springer Science+Business Media academic journals
English-language journals
Publications established in 1891